John Alexander "Joker" Cameron (23 October 1881 – 17 March 1941) was an Australian rules footballer who played with South Melbourne in the Victorian Football League (VFL).

Cameron, who was originally from Frankston, played in a variety of role during his league career. He often appeared as a defender and follower, but was a half forward flanker in South Melbourne's 1909 premiership team. He also played in the 1907 VFL Grand Final, which South Melbourne lost.

References

External links
 

1881 births
Australian rules footballers from Melbourne
Sydney Swans players
Sydney Swans Premiership players
1941 deaths
Frankston Football Club players
One-time VFL/AFL Premiership players
People from Frankston, Victoria